The canton of La Seyne-sur-Mer-2 is an administrative division of the Var department, southeastern France. It was created at the French canton reorganisation which came into effect in March 2015. Its seat is in La Seyne-sur-Mer.

It consists of the following communes:
Saint-Mandrier-sur-Mer
La Seyne-sur-Mer (partly)
Six-Fours-les-Plages

References

Cantons of Var (department)